Ilminster is a minster town and civil parish in the South Somerset district of Somerset, England, with a population of 5,808. Bypassed in 1988, the town now lies just east of the junction of the A303 (London to Exeter) and the A358 (Taunton to Chard and Axminster). The parish includes the hamlet of Sea.

History

Ilminster is mentioned in documents dating from 725 and in a Charter granted to Muchelney Abbey ( to the north) by Æthelred the Unready in 995. Ilminster is also mentioned in Domesday Book (1086) as Ileminstre meaning 'The church on the River Isle' from the Old English ysle and mynster. By this period Ilminster was a flourishing community and was granted the right to hold a weekly market, which it still does.

Ilminster was part of the hundred of Abdick and Bulstone.

In 1645 during the English Civil War Ilminster was the scene of a skirmish between parliamentary troops under Edward Massie and Royalist forces under Lord Goring who fought for control of the bridges prior to the Battle of Langport.

The town contains the buildings of a sixteenth-century grammar school, the Ilminster Meeting House, which acts as the town's art gallery and concert hall. There is also a Gospel Hall.

Governance

The parish council has responsibility for local issues, including setting an annual precept (local rate) to cover the council's operating costs and producing annual accounts for public scrutiny. The parish council evaluates local planning applications and works with the local police, district council officers, and neighbourhood watch groups on matters of crime, security, and traffic. The parish council's role also includes initiating projects for the maintenance and repair of parish facilities, as well as consulting with the district council on the maintenance, repair, and improvement of highways, drainage, footpaths, public transport, and street cleaning. Conservation matters (including trees and listed buildings) and environmental issues are also the responsibility of the council.

The town falls within the Non-metropolitan district of South Somerset, which was formed on 1 April 1974 under the Local Government Act 1972, having previously been part of Chard Rural District and Ilminster Urban District. The district council is responsible for local planning and building control, local roads, council housing, environmental health, markets and fairs, refuse collection and recycling, cemeteries and crematoria, leisure services, parks, and tourism.

Somerset County Council is responsible for running the largest and most expensive local services such as education, social services, libraries, main roads, public transport, policing and fire services, trading standards, waste disposal and strategic planning.

There is an electoral ward of the same name. The ward focuses on Ilminster but also includes Whitelackington. The total population of the ward taken at the 2011 census was 6,017.

It is also part of the Yeovil county constituency represented in the House of Commons of the Parliament of the United Kingdom. It elects one Member of Parliament (MP) by the first past the post system of election.

Geography

Ilminster is close to the River Isle and the A303 road.

Climate
Along with the rest of South West England, Ilminster has a temperate climate which is generally wetter and milder than the rest of the country. Seasonal temperature variation is less extreme than most of the United Kingdom because of the adjacent sea temperatures. In the summer the Azores high pressure affects the south-west of England, however convective cloud sometimes forms inland, reducing the number of hours of sunshine. Annual sunshine rates are slightly less than the regional average of 1,600 hours. In December 1998 there were 20 days without sun recorded at Yeovilton. Most of the rainfall in the south-west is caused by Atlantic depressions or by convection. Most of the rainfall in autumn and winter is caused by the Atlantic depressions, which is when they are most active. In summer, a large proportion of the rainfall is caused by sun heating the ground leading to convection and to showers and thunderstorms. About 8–15 days of snowfall is typical. November to March have the highest mean wind speeds, and June to August have the lightest winds. The predominant wind direction is from the south-west.

Church

Ilminster takes its name from the River Isle and its large church of St Mary, which is known as The Minster. The Hamstone building dates from the 15th century, but was refurbished in 1825 by William Burgess and the chancel restored in 1883. Further restoration took place in 1887-89 and 1902. Among the principal features are the Wadham tombs; those of Sir William Wadham and his mother, dated 1452 and Nicholas and Dorothy Wadham 1609 and 1618.

The tower rises two storeys above the nave. It has three bays, with a stair turret to the north-west corner. The bays are articulated by slender buttresses with crocketed finials above the castellated parapet. Each bay on both stages contains a tall two-light mullioned-and-transomed window with tracery. The lights to the top are filled with pierced stonework; those to the base are solid. The stair turret has string courses coinciding with those on the tower, and a spirelet with a weathervane. It contains a bell dating from 1732 made by Thomas Bilbie and another from 1790 made by William Bilbie of the Bilbie family. The church has been designated by English Heritage as a Grade I listed building.

Shopping

The town has a selection of shops including a traditional Edwardian-style clothing and soft furnishings store called Dyers. A Tesco superstore opened in November 2007.

In November the town celebrates the lighting of the Christmas lights with a Victorian evening. This is normally accompanied by local shops serving rum and cakes.

Culture
The 'Ilminster Literary Festival', launched in 2016, has become and established annual celebration which is usually held in early Summer.

Transport

Rail 
Ilminster railway station on the Chard Branch Line closed in 1962. There were also some sidings, to allow trains going in opposite directions to pass each other. The nearest running railway station is located at Crewkerne.

Buses & Coaches 
There are multiple bus services that run through the town, including Buses of Somerset and an express service to London operated by Berrys Coaches.

Roads 
Ilminster lies just east of the junction of the A303 (London to Exeter) and the A358 (Taunton to Chard and Axminster). The B3168 runs through the middle of the town. There have been concerns of the safety of roads in Ilminster, however schemes were announced by Somerset County Council in 2014 to make local roads safer for pedestrians and drivers.

Cycling 
Ilminster is linked to Chard via the Chard to Ilminster Cycle Path. The path is part of the Wessex Way Cycle Route

Twinnings
Ilminster is twinned with Riec-sur-Belon in France.

Notable people
See also :Category:People from Ilminster
 John Baker was born in Ilminster before emigrating to Australia and becoming the Premier of South Australia.
 Charles Moore, the geologist, was born in Ilminster.

References

External links

 The Somerset Urban Archaeological Survey: Ilminster, by Clare Gathercole
Ilminster's Community Website
Visit Ilminster

 
Towns in South Somerset
Market towns in Somerset
Civil parishes in Somerset